Control Factor is a 2003 Sci Fi Pictures science fiction TV-movie.

Plot
After a mysterious, disheveled man nearly kills him, insurance salesman Lance Bishop hears a voice in his head urging him to murder his wife. When he discovers he has become part of a government mind-control project, he and others similarly being experimented on fight back.

Cast
 Adam Baldwin as Lance Bishop
 Elizabeth Berkley as Karen Bishop
 Tony Todd as Reggie
 John Neville as Director
 Peter Spence as Trevor Constantine
 David Ferry as Detective Jordan
 Mif as Homeless Trance Man
 Raoul Bhaneja as Clerk

Reception

References

External links
 http://www.pactsntl.org
 Control Factor official site (Sci Fi Channel). Archived from the original on February 16, 2009.
 

2003 science fiction films
2003 television films
2003 films
Films about mind control
Films directed by Nelson McCormick
Syfy original films
2000s American films